"Beg for You" is a song by English singer and songwriter Charli XCX featuring Japanese-British singer Rina Sawayama. It was released on 27 January 2022 as the third single from XCX's fifth studio album, Crash (2022). The song interpolates Swedish singer September's 2006 single "Cry for You", as well as the song "Don't Cry" by Belgian dance group Milk Inc. The song received universal acclaim from music critics.

Background 
Charli XCX first teased a collaboration with Rina Sawayama in May 2021 on a TikTok live in which she discussed details about her upcoming album Crash and played multiple snippets of upcoming tracks from the album, including a 45-second-long one of the then-untitled collaboration with Sawayama. In December 2021, screenshots of text messages between XCX and Sawayama discussing a collaboration were posted on Instagram. On 21 January 2022, Sawayama revealed the title of the single on her TikTok account. The song premiered on 27 January 2022 on BBC Radio 1.

In an interview with Entertainment Weekly, XCX discussed her inspiration behind "Beg for You". She stated that "It feels to me like one of those songs that comes on at the height of a party where you are a little bit [fucked] up, you maybe want to cry, but you also want to dance. When I was driving through L.A. listening to this beat for the first time, I felt a real sense of euphoria - but also this quite nostalgic thing. Because it's a garage beat, it reminded me of being at home in the U.K., at a house party with my friends who I've known since I was 12 years old." Additionally, she revealed that her and Sawayama first collaborated on a ballad for XCX's 2019 studio album Charli, but the track was scrapped after Sawayama expressed a desire to create a pop track instead. The song's demo was pitched to XCX, who "changed a few lyrics here and there, and sang it", and then forwarded it to Sawayama.

Music and lyrics 
"Beg for You" is a UK garage song which "evokes the bubblegum sweetness of early 2000s pop" and features a beat "evocative of '90s house music", "wistful" piano riffs and a drop. The beat, along with the melody and hook are sampled from Swedish singer September's hit single "Cry for You". Lyrically, it is a "clubby and poignant message to a leaving lover" in which the singers "exchange verses about missing their respective loves when they depart, reminiscing about intimate moments when they're gone".

Critical reception 
"Beg for You" received universal acclaim from music critics. The track was placed on NMEs NME Radio playlist and highlighted as "On the A List", with Karen Gwee calling it "perfect for a cathartic cry on the dancefloor". It was also placed on Papers list of "10 New Songs You Need to Hear Now" by writer Shaad D'Souza, who lauded it as the "apotheosis of the [2000s rave revival] trend", as well as MTV's weekly "Bop Shop" selection, where XCX and Sawayama were praised for "turn[ing] a blast from the past into a fresh new dance-floor banger". Jason Lipshutz of Billboard also had a positive view of the song and opined that "you'd be hard-pressed to find two artists in their shared genre with more personality on the microphone, and they each leave a lasting impression while hoisting up a pristine melody". "Beg for You" was celebrated by Steffanee Wang of Nylon as "outstanding", a "sparkling gem", "an absolute smash" and "infinitely more swoon-worthy and addictive" compared to September's "Cry for You". Consequence selected it as their "Song of the Week", citing it as "a worthy collaboration between two artists who know what pop music needs to go from good to great". The release's use of a "Cry for You" sample, dubbed "one of [its] secret weapons", was also praised. Justin Curto of Vulture thought it to be "extremely well-executed", Steffanee Wang deemed the interpolation "ingenious: keep all the best parts of the nostalgia, and update enough of it to bring it into the new age".

Music video 
Backstage teasers for a music video have been posted on TikTok by Sawayama. The music video was later released on February 11, 2022.

Track listing 
Digital download and streaming
 "Beg for You" – 2:48

Streaming – bonus tracks
 "Beg for You" – 2:48
 "New Shapes" – 3:20
 "Good Ones" – 2:16

Digital download and streaming – Pocket Remix
 "Beg for You" (Pocket Remix) – 3:00
 "Beg for You" – 2:48

Digital download and streaming – A. G. Cook and Vernon Remix
 "Beg for You" (A. G. Cook and Vernon of Seventeen Remix) – 4:09
 "Beg for You" (Pocket Remix) – 3:00
 "Beg for You" – 2:48

Charts

Weekly charts

Year-end charts

Certifications

Release history

References

Charli XCX songs
Rina Sawayama songs
2022 songs
2022 singles
Songs written by Charli XCX
Songs written by Jonas von der Burg
Songs written by Anoo Bhagavan
Song recordings produced by Digital Farm Animals
Songs written by Sorana (singer)
UK garage songs
Eurodance songs
Asylum Records singles
Warner Records singles
Songs written by Rina Sawayama